The Port Republic Historic District in Port Republic, Atlantic County, New Jersey is a  historic district that was listed on the National Register of Historic Places in 1991.

In 1991, the district included 110 buildings deemed to contribute to the historic character of the area, and four other contributing sites.

References

External links
 

Historic districts on the National Register of Historic Places in New Jersey
Houses on the National Register of Historic Places in New Jersey
Tourist attractions in Atlantic County, New Jersey
Geography of Atlantic County, New Jersey
National Register of Historic Places in Atlantic County, New Jersey
Houses in Atlantic County, New Jersey
New Jersey Register of Historic Places
Port Republic, New Jersey
Greek Revival architecture in New Jersey
Victorian architecture in New Jersey
1774 establishments in New Jersey
Colonial architecture in New Jersey